Dampiera stricta commonly known as blue dampiera, is a flowering plant in the  family Goodeniaceae. It is a small sub-shrub with variable leaves and mostly blue, mauve or purple flowers.

Description

Taxonomy and naming
Dampiera stricta was first formally described in 1810 by Robert Brown and the description was published in Prodromus Florae Novae Hollandiae et Insulae Van Diemen.The specific epithet (stricta) means "straight" or "erect".

Distribution and habitat
Blue dampiera is a common species usually growing in open forest and heath on sandy, gravel or loamy soils in New South Wales, Queensland and Victoria on the Great Dividing Range and coastal locations.

References

stricta
Flora of New South Wales
Flora of Queensland
Flora of Tasmania
Flora of Victoria (Australia)
Endemic flora of Australia